William Leyshon is an Australian former professional rugby league footballer who played in the 1990s and 2000s. He played for  North Sydney, Northern Eagles, Melbourne Storm and finally Parramatta.

Playing career
Leyshon made his first grade debut for North Sydney against Parramatta in round 14 of the 1995 ARL season at North Sydney Oval.  

In the 1998 NRL season, Leyshon made 24 appearances as Norths finished 5th on the table but were eliminated from the finals series after losing both matches against Parramatta and Canterbury-Bankstown.  

Leyshon played with the club up until their controversial merger with arch rivals Manly-Warringah to form the Northern Eagles.  Leyshon was one of the few Norths players offered a contract to play for the new side. While with the Northern Eagles, Leyshon struggled with knee injuries and was limited to 11 appearances in three seasons.

In 2002, Leyshon joined Melbourne and played one season with them before joining Parramatta in 2003.  Leyshon managed just two appearances for Parramatta and retired at the end of the season.

Coaching career
On October 11, 2017, Leyshon was announced as the inaugural coach for the new North Sydney Bears Under 20's side.

References

1976 births
Living people
Australian rugby league coaches
Australian rugby league players
North Sydney Bears players
Northern Eagles players
Parramatta Eels players
Melbourne Storm players
Rugby league second-rows
Rugby league locks
Rugby league hookers
Rugby league players from Blacktown